Tiyari is a village located in Ghazipur District of Uttar Pradesh, India.

Demographic

References

Villages in Ghazipur district